{{DISPLAYTITLE:C5H7N3}}
The molecular formula C5H7N3 may refer to:

 Brunfelsamidine, a poisonous plant derivative, which has convulsant and neurotoxic effects
 3,4-Diaminopyridine, compound predominantly used as a drug in the treatment of rare muscle diseases